Li Ting and Sun Tiantian were the defending champions, but Li did not compete that year.

Sun partnering Ji Chunmei lost in the semifinals.

Seeds

 Chan Yung-jan Chuang Chia-jung (final)
 Nicole Pratt Mara Santangelo (champions)
 Yuliana Fedak Anastassia Rodionova (quarterfinals)
 Jarmila Gajdošová Jelena Kostanić Tošić (semifinals)

Draw

Draw

Notes
The winners will receive $6,960 and 115 ranking points.
The runners-up will receive $3,740 and 80 ranking points.
The last direct acceptance team was Vasilisa Bardina and Romina Oprandi (combined ranking of 390st).
The player representative was Aiko Nakamura.

External links
Pattaya Women's Open website

Doubles
Pattaya Women's Open - Doubles
 in women's tennis